Hydnum magnorufescens is a species of fungus in the family Hydnaceae native to the southern Europe, Sichuan Province in China and Russia.

References 

Fungi described in 2013
Fungi of Europe
Fungi of China
magnorufescens